Eli Sims Shorter (March 15, 1823 – April 29, 1879) was a U.S. Representative from Alabama.

Born in Monticello, Georgia, Shorter attended the common schools and was graduated in law from Yale College in 1844. He was admitted to the bar and commenced practice in Eufaula, Alabama, in 1844. He also engaged in agricultural pursuits.

Shorter was elected as a Democrat to the Thirty-fourth and Thirty-fifth Congresses (March 4, 1855 – March 3, 1859). He resumed the practice of law in Eufaula, Alabama. During the Civil War, he served in the Confederate States Army as colonel of the 18th Regiment Alabama Infantry. He died in Eufaula, Alabama, April 29, 1879. He was interred in Fairview Cemetery.

References
 Retrieved on 2009-03-18

External links

1823 births
1879 deaths
People from Monticello, Georgia
Alabama lawyers
Yale College alumni
Confederate States Army officers
People of Alabama in the American Civil War
People from Eufaula, Alabama
Democratic Party members of the United States House of Representatives from Alabama
19th-century American politicians
19th-century American lawyers